Shane Biggs (born 5 August 1991) is a former Australian rules footballer who played for the Sydney Swans and the Western Bulldogs in the Australian Football League (AFL). He was originally recruited by the Sydney Swans from the Bendigo Football Club in the Victorian Football League  (VFL) with the 13th selection in the 2012 Rookie Draft. Biggs did not play in the TAC Cup competition, the traditional pathway into the AFL for Victorians.

He was elevated from the rookie list to the senior list in July 2013, and made his AFL debut in the final round of the 2013 AFL season. Biggs played in the first two finals for the Swans' but was dropped for the qualifying final, before regaining his place for the semi and preliminary finals. Biggs regained his senior spot with 3 rounds to spare until finals. He played in all 3 games but lost his spot for the qualifying final. 

Biggs announced his retirement at the end of the 2018 season.

Statistics
 Statistics are correct to the end of the 2016 season

|- style="background-color: #EAEAEA"
! scope="row" style="text-align:center" | 2013
|style="text-align:center;"|
| 46 || 3 || 0 || 0 || 28 || 26 || 54 || 13 || 4 || 0.0 || 0.0 || 9.3 || 8.7 || 18.0 || 4.3 || 1.3
|-
! scope="row" style="text-align:center" | 2014
|style="text-align:center;"|
| 46 || 3 || 0 || 0 || 31 || 20 || 51 || 9 || 12 || 0.0 || 0.0 || 10.3 || 6.7 || 17.0 || 3.0 || 4.0
|- style="background-color: #EAEAEA"
! scope="row" style="text-align:center" | 2015
|style="text-align:center;"|
| 24 || 10 || 3 || 0 || 141 || 56 || 197 || 34 || 21 || 0.3 || 0.0 || 14.1 || 5.6 || 19.7 || 3.4 || 2.1
|-
| scope=row bgcolor=F0E68C | 2016# 
|style="text-align:center;"|
| 24 || 26 || 4 || 2 || 334 || 212 || 546 || 116 || 54 || 0.2 || 0.1 || 12.8 || 8.2 || 21.0 || 4.5 || 2.1
|- class="sortbottom"
! colspan=3| Career
! 42
! 7
! 2
! 534
! 314
! 848
! 172
! 91
! 0.2
! 0.0
! 12.7
! 7.5
! 20.2
! 4.1
! 2.2
|}

Honours and achievements
Team
AFL premiership: 2016

Relationships

Shane Biggs is known to be a very loveable character and always has time for his fans. He is currently dating Melbourne local Sophie Richards, who used to be seen DJ-ing at the local clubs.

References

External links

Living people
1991 births
Sydney Swans players
Western Bulldogs players
Western Bulldogs Premiership players
Bendigo Football Club players
Australian rules footballers from Victoria (Australia)
One-time VFL/AFL Premiership players